The Timeout Drawer is an American post-rock band from Chicago, Illinois, formed in 1999. It consists of Chris Eichenseer, Jason Goldberg, Jon Slusher, and Chris Van Pelt.

Members

Current members
 Chris Eichenseer – drums
 Jason Goldberg – keyboards, synthesizer
 Jon Slusher – guitar, vocals
 Chris Van Pelt – guitar, bass guitar

Past members
 Ray Dybzinski

Discography

Studio albums
 Record of Small Histories (2000)
 A Difficult Future (2001)
 Nowonmai (2005)

EPs
 Presents Left for the Living Dead (2003)
 Alone (2006)

Singles
 "Terrible Secrets Revealed for an Instant by a Flash of Lightning" (2003)
 "The Exorcist" (2005)

References

External links
 Official website (archive)
 

American post-rock groups
Musical groups from Chicago